Beverley Town Football Club is an English football club based in Beverley, East Riding of Yorkshire, they play their home games at Norwood Recreation Ground. 

Website: https://www.beverleytownfootball.com/

History
The club was a founder member of the Humber Premier League in 2000. They won the league championship for the first time in 2013, and added two further titles before being promoted to the Northern Counties East League in 2022.

On 22 July 2022, Beverley announced the signing of former Sampdoria and Napoli winger, Daniele Mannini. The move came about after a chance encounter in which Mannini had met chairman Mark Smith whilst the two were walking dogs with Smith inviting him to pre-season training.

Honours
Humber Premier League Premier Division
Champions 2012–13, 2013–14, 2020–21
Runners-up 2021–22

References

Football clubs in England
Football clubs in the East Riding of Yorkshire
Northern Counties East Football League
Humber Premier League